The Milkweed EP is the debut release by Canadian singer-songwriter Royal Wood, released in 2002.

Track listing
 "Of Milkweed"
 "Chamomile"
 "Freezing in Fire"
 "Dog-Eared Day"
 "Off My Sleeve"

References

2002 EPs
Royal Wood albums